Unnai Charanadaindhen is a 2003 Indian Tamil-language romantic drama film directed by Samuthirakani, starring Venkat Prabhu, S. P. B. Charan and Meera Vasudevan. Samuthirakani's directorial debut, it was produced by Charan's Capital Film Works and features a soundtrack composed by S. P. Balasubrahmanyam. Although the film was made on a small budget and fetched critical acclaim upon release, also winning two Tamil Nadu State Film Awards, Charan has said that it was not a profitable venture. Samuthirakani later directed the Telugu remake Naalo (2004).

Plot
Nandha and Kannan are dearest friends. While Kannan is goofy, fun-loving and naïve; Nandha is somber, serious and responsible. He takes the onus of taking care of Kannan and helping him in all ways which makes Kannan absolutely devoted to Nandha. Teja is in love with Nandha and he reciprocates. Enters Bobby, a well-to-do, sophisticated, intelligent and responsible girl who falls in love with Kannan seeing his goodness. Kannan too loves her but Nandha does not approve without which Kannan won't proceed. Nandha starts to punish Kannan subtly at first and overtly later for maintaining relations with Bobby.

Bobby's family and her brother do not approve of Kannan and tries to get rid of him wherein Nandha steps in to save him. A tug of war over Kannan starts between Bobby and Nandha. Is Nandha's intentions for Kannan pure or is he simply unwilling to forgo his control over him seeing him as a slave? Will Bobby be steadfast or is she simply using him to have fun?

Cast
 Venkat Prabhu as Kannan
 S. P. B. Charan as Nandha
 Meera Vasudevan as Bobby, Kannan's lover
 Santhoshi as Teja, the girl who loves Nandha
 Nizhalgal Ravi
 Ilavarasu as Teja's father
 Riyaz Khan
 Paravai Muniyamma
 Anju
 Hari Prashanth
 Black Pandi

Soundtrack
The film's soundtrack was composed by noted playback singer S. P. Balasubrahmanyam, Charan's father, and consists of six songs with lyrics penned by Gangai Amaren, Venkat Prabhu's father. Balasubrahmanyam himself lent his voice for three songs, while noted composers M. S. Viswanathan and Ilaiyaraaja co-sang the first song of the album. Aside from Balasubrahmanyam, his sister S. P. Sailaja and his daughter Pallavi had also performed each one song. The film score was composed by Srinivasa Moorthy.

Reception

Critical response
Chennaionline.com wrote: "A neatly crafted screenplay with some engaging situations, catchy lines, well etched characters, sensitive treatment and some fine performances, all make debutant director Samuthiraikani's maiden directorial effort Unnai Charanadainthein worth watching. Balaji Balasubramaniam from Thiraipadam.com commented: "Barring the weak third act, the movie is engaging as it places one person in the middle of both a romance and friendship and gets the other two to fight over him".

Awards
 2003 Tamil Nadu State Film Awards
 Tamil Nadu State Film Award Special Prize
 Tamil Nadu State Film Award for Best Story Writer - Samuthirakani

References

External links

2003 romantic drama films
Indian romantic drama films
2003 films
Films directed by Samuthirakani
2000s Tamil-language films
Films scored by S. P. Balasubrahmanyam
Tamil films remade in other languages
2003 directorial debut films